(born April 2, 1951) is a Japanese actress from Shimizu (now part of the city of Shizuoka), Shizuoka Prefecture, Japan.

Yōko starred in the NHK morning drama Kumo no Jūtan, achieving widespread popularity. Since then she has appeared in various television, film, and stage productions. In addition to contemporary roles, Yōko has taken parts in jidaigeki. She portrayed Yaya in the 1987 NHK Taiga drama Onna Taikōki, and from 1988 to 1994 she played Osai, the wife of the fire captain, in Abarenbo Shogun (the second of three actresses for that character). Yōko voiced Maddie Hayes, the Cybill Shepherd role, in the dubbed version of Moonlighting.

Filmography

Television  
Kumo no Jūtan (1976), Makoto
Onna Taikōki (1981), Yaya
Oshin (1983–84), Michiko Takura
Ohisama (2011), Saki Sakurai

Film
Willful Murder (1981), Kawada
The Voice of Sin (2020), Mitsuko Ōshima
Kono Chiisana Te (2023)

Awards

References

External references
Yôko Asaji at IMDB

1951 births
Japanese actresses
Living people
People from Shizuoka (city)
Asadora lead actors